Hovhannes Danielyan (born April 11, 1987 in Armenian SSR) is an Armenian light flyweight amateur boxer. He is a European Champion and Olympian.

Career
Danielyan won a bronze medal at the 2004 Junior World Amateur Boxing Championships in Jeju. Danielyan won a bronze medal at the 2006 European Amateur Boxing Championships in Plovdiv. He reached the quarterfinals of the 2007 World Amateur Boxing Championships, and thus qualified for the upcoming Olympics. At the 2008 Summer Olympics, Danielyan beat Thomas Essomba in the first round before, but lost to Birzhan Zhakypov in the following round. Danielyan won a gold medal at the 2008 European Amateur Boxing Championships in Liverpool. He defeated Jose de la Nieve Linares in the finals. Danielyan, along with Eduard Hambardzumyan, became the first boxers from the independent Armenia to become European Champions. He also won a bronze medal at the 2010 European Amateur Boxing Championships in Moscow. Danielyan became an Armenian Champion in 2010 and 2012.

References

External links
 

1987 births
Living people
Light-flyweight boxers
Olympic boxers of Armenia
Boxers at the 2008 Summer Olympics
Armenian male boxers